The 2007 Pacific Rugby Cup was the second edition of the Pacific Rugby Cup competition and featured 6 representative rugby union football teams; 2 from each of the three Pacific rugby unions – Fiji, Samoa and Tonga. It was played from 31 March to 5 May.

In the grand final match, Upolu Samoa was victorious on Tongan soil, beating the Tau'uta Reds in the decider by 20 points (35 to 15).

Teams and format
The six teams that were created for the inaugural 2006 competition returned to compete in 2007. These teams were:

Savaii Samoa
Upolu Samoa
Fiji Warriors
Fiji Barbarians
Tau'uta Reds
Tautahi Gold

The teams played a single round robin (home or away) series. The two top-ranked teams at the end of the standings met in the grand final match, with the first-ranked team awarded home advantage.

Table 
{| class="wikitable"
|-
!width=165|Team
!width=40|Played
!width=40|Won
!width=40|Drawn
!width=40|Lost
!width=40|For
!width=40|Against
!width=40|Point Difference
!width=40|Bonus Points
!width=40|Points
|- bgcolor=#ccffcc align=center
|align=left| Tau'uta Reds
|5||4||0||1||108||102||+6||1||17
|- bgcolor=#ccffcc align=center
|align=left| Upolu Samoa
|5||3||0||2||112||114||-2||3||15
|- align=center
|align=left| Fiji Barbarians
|5||2||0||3||97||108||-11||4||12
|-  align=center
|align=left| Savaii Samoa
|5||2||0||3||106||88||18||3||11
|-  align=center
|align=left| Fiji Warriors
|5||2||0||3||93||90||+3||1||11
|- align=center
|align=left| Tautahi Gold
|5||2||0||3||84||98||-14||1||9
|}

Match results

Final

See also
Pacific Rugby Cup

References

External links
FORU website 

World Rugby Pacific Challenge
Pacific Rugby Cup
Pacific Rugby Cup
Pacific Rugby Cup
Pacific Rugby Cup
Pacific